The Chicago Railroad Fair was an event organized to celebrate and commemorate 100 years of railroad history west of Chicago, Illinois.  It was held in Chicago in 1948 and 1949 along the shore of Lake Michigan and is often referred to as "the last great railroad fair" with 39 railroad companies participating.  The board of directors for the show was a veritable "Who's Who" of railroad company executives.

History of the fair 
The origin of the fair traces back to the Chicago and North Western Railway (CNW), which at the time was the successor of the first railroad to operate out of Chicago, the Galena and Chicago Union Railroad. CNW was seeking a way to commemorate 100 years of railroading in Chicago, especially as it was done on the CNW itself. Public Relations Manager F.V. Koval is credited with developing the idea behind the fair. The CNW advertising and public relation staff went to work to promote the show in the early months of 1948, beginning with a series of photographs made by company photographer Don Lidikay of people in 19th century costumes posing with the locomotive Pioneer, which had pulled the first train out of Chicago in 1848.

The fair was rapidly planned during the winter and spring of 1948, and originally scheduled to run between July and August of that summer. A grand opening for the fair commenced on July 20 with a parade that featured such spectacles as a military marching band and a replica of a troop train, a contingent of cowboys and Native Americans, a replica of the Tom Thumb, the first American locomotive, and the spry, octogenarian widow of Casey Jones, who served as honorary Grand Master of the parade. One dollar was the price of admission, and, except food, all the attractions, displays, exhibits and shows were free. Besides the thirty-nine railroads who participated in the fair, there were more than twenty equipment manufacturers, including General Motors. The Santa Fe also sponsored an Indian Village where Native Americans sold handicrafts, staged dances, and explained the different types of lodging that were on display.

A popular ride for visitors was the Narrow Gauge (3-foot) excursion train which ran the length of the grounds, charged at 10 cents per ride. The train, supplied for the Fair by CB&Q, consisted of refurbished Colorado and Southern Number 9, a 2-6-0 built in 1882, and coaches, open observation cars and a railway post office car which had been built new by CB&Q in 1880's style. The train was lettered for the Deadwood Central Railroad, a defunct railroad in South Dakota. For the 1949 Fair, D&RGW provided a second train, with its own refurbished 2-8-0 number 268 and coaches, all lettered for the fictional "Colorado Springs and Tincup Railroad".
The complete "Deadwood Central" train was acquired in 1956 by the Black Hills Central Railroad, but the name was not continued.

A highlight of the fair was the presence of the Freedom Train. The Freedom Train travelled the country from September 17, 1947, through Jan 22, 1949, and was at the Railroad Fair from July 5 – 9.   It held many documents and artifacts from the National Archives. Available for public viewing  were the original  United States Constitution, Declaration of Independence and the Bill of Rights. Security of the documents was the responsibility of the Marine Corps.

Board of directors 
The officers and board of directors for the fair were mostly prominent railroad executives.  The fair's officers were:

 President - Lenox R. Lohr, President Museum of Science and Industry in Chicago
 Vice President - R.L. Williams, President Chicago and North Western Railway
 Treasurer - Wayne A. Johnston, President Illinois Central Railroad
 Secretary - G. M. Campbell, Vice President Baltimore and Ohio Railroad

The fair's directors included (in alphabetical order by surname):

 Arthur K. Atkinson, President Wabash Railroad
 John W. Barriger III, President Monon Railroad
 T. D. Beven, President Elgin, Joliet and Eastern Railroad
 J. J. Brinkworth, Vice President New York Central System
 John M. Budd, Vice President Great Northern Railway
 Ralph Budd, President Burlington Lines
 C. H. Buford, President Chicago, Milwaukee, St. Paul and Pacific Railroad
 G. M. Campbell, Vice President Baltimore and Ohio Railroad
 Thomas J. Deegan, Vice President Chesapeake and Ohio Railroad
 William N. Deramus III, President Chicago Great Western Railway
 S. A. Dobbs, Vice President Gulf, Mobile and Ohio Railroad
 J. D. Farrington, President Rock Island Lines
 P. E. Feucht, Vice President Pennsylvania Railroad
 E. S. French, President Boston and Maine Railroad
 Charles J. Graham, President Pittsburgh and West Virginia Railway
 Fred Gurley, President Atchison, Topeka and Santa Fe Railway
 C. R. Harding, President Pullman Company
 Wayne A. Johnston, President Illinois Central Railroad
 J. D. Dodson, President Texas Mexican Railway
 Lenox R. Lohr, President Museum of Science and Industry in Chicago
 Wilson McCarthy, President Denver and Rio Grande Western Railroad
 H. E. McGee, President Green Bay and Western Railroad
 C. M. Roddewig, President Chicago and Eastern Illinois Railroad
 F. L. Schrader, President Chicago and Illinois Midland Railway
 C. A. Skog, Vice President and General Manager Grand Trunk Railway
 A. E. Stoddard, President Union Pacific Railroad
 A. Syverson, Vice President and General Manager Lake Superior and Ishpeming Railroad
 P. H. Van Hoven, President Duluth, Missabe and Iron Range Railway
 R.L. Williams, President Chicago and North Western Railway
 L. L. White, President Nickel Plate Road
 Ward Wire, Vice President Colorado and Wyoming Railway
 R. E. Woodruff, President Erie Railroad

Participating railroads 
38 railroads and more than 20 railroad equipment manufacturers participated in the Chicago Railroad Fair exhibiting equipment and interpretive displays around the fair's theme of 100 years of railroad history.  The majority of the participating railroads maintained a direct rail connection to Chicago.  The companies that participated included:

 Atchison, Topeka and Santa Fe Railway
 Baltimore and Ohio Railroad
 Boston and Maine Railroad
 Burlington Lines
 Chesapeake and Ohio Railway
 Chicago and Eastern Illinois Railroad
 Chicago Great Western Railway
 Chicago and Illinois Midland Railway
 Chicago, Indianapolis and Louisville Railway (Monon Railroad)
 Chicago, Milwaukee, St. Paul and Pacific Railroad (Milwaukee Road)
 Chicago and North Western Railway
 Colorado and Wyoming Railway
 Denver and Rio Grande Western Railroad
 Duluth, Missabe and Iron Range Railway
 Elgin, Joliet and Eastern Railway
 Erie Railroad
 Grand Trunk Railway
 Great Northern Railway
 Green Bay and Western Railroad
 Gulf, Mobile and Ohio Railroad (The Alton Route)
 Illinois Central Railroad
 Lake Superior and Ishpeming Railroad
 Maine Central Railroad
 Minneapolis and St. Louis Railway
 Monongahela Railway
 New York Central Railroad
 Nickel Plate Road
 Norfolk and Western Railway
 Northern Pacific Railway
 Pennsylvania Railroad
 Pittsburgh and West Virginia Railway
 Pullman Company
 Rock Island Lines
 Soo Line Railroad
 Spokane, Portland and Seattle Railway
 Texas Mexican Railway
 Union Pacific Railroad
 Wabash Railroad
 Western Pacific Railroad

Rolling stock displays
 

The highlight of the Chicago Railroad Fair was the "Wheels A-Rolling" pageant.  This was a dramatic and musical presentation intended to showcase the development of transportation and the railroads across the country beginning with trails and waterways.  The pageant included a recreation of the Golden Spike ceremony at Promontory, Utah, and various historic rolling stock and replicas of equipment in operation.

Railroad equipment used in the pageant included:

Original equipment

 No. 222 and coach
 No. 637, Zulu and combine car
 No. 10250
 Cumberland Valley Pioneer and coach
 Empire State Express No. 999
 The General (1948 only)
 John Hancock and coach
 Illinois Central 201 and coach
 Little Butter Cup and two coaches
 Minnetonka and two logging trucks
 Pioneer and coach
 Pioneer Zephyr
 Reuben Wells and coach
 "Union Pacific Big Boy"
 William Crooks and two coaches
 William Mason and baggage car number 10

Replicas
 Atlantic and two replica coaches
 Best Friend of Charleston
 Chicago horse car
 DeWitt Clinton and three coaches
 John Bull and coach
 Jupiter (portrayed by Virginia and Truckee Railroad locomotive Genoa and by V&T #22 Inyo) and combine car
 Lafayette and two barrel cars
 Pioneer horse car
 Pullman coach number 9
 State Street cable car
 Tom Thumb locomotive and director's car
 Union Pacific No. 119 (portrayed by V&T #18 Dayton and by Chicago, Burlington, and Quincy locomotive no. 35)

Legacy 
In addition to being the last great assembly of railroad equipment and technology by participating railroad companies, the 1948 Chicago Railroad Fair holds a lesser known honor and connection to Disneyland.  In 1948 Walt Disney and animator Ward Kimball attended the fair.  To their enjoyment they not only got to see all of the equipment, but they were also allowed to operate some of the steam locomotives that were at the Fair.  Upon their return to Los Angeles, Disney used the Fair, the House of David Amusement Park, and Greenfield Village, as inspiration for a "Mickey Mouse Park" that eventually became Disneyland.  Walt also went on to build his own backyard railroads, building the Carolwood Pacific Railroad. Kimball already had his own, named Grizzly Flats Railroad.

Media of fair

Photos from the Fair

Films from the Fair
 Chicago Railroad Fair & Pageant (Chicago Film Archives, Margaret Conneely Collection, 1950, 16mm., Color, Sound)
 1948: Chicago Railroad Fair (Chicago Film Archives, Lake Shore Club of Chicago Collection, c 1948, 8mm, Color Silent)

References

Notes

External links 
 Photo of the Chicago Railroad Fair entrance on July 26, 1948  This site includes many more color photos from the fair; use "Chicago Railroad Fair" as the search term.
 Photos from the Chicago Railroad Fair
 Great Northern Railway's 1948 Chicago Railroad Fair flyer
 Recording of the Wheels A Rolling music pageant
 Movie from the 1949 Chicago Railroad Fair

Rail transportation in Illinois
Trade shows in the United States
History of Chicago
Festivals in Chicago